Scythris maroccensis is a moth of the family Scythrididae. It was described by Eberhard Jäckh in 1977. It is found in Morocco.

References

maroccensis
Moths described in 1977